Fomitiporia nobilissima is a fungus in the family Hymenochaetaceae. Found in Gabon, it was described as new to science in 2010.

References

External links

Hymenochaetaceae
Fungi described in 2010
Fungi of Africa